Pseudomonas argentinensis is a yellow-pigmented, Gram-negative, rod-shaped, non-spore-forming, strictly aerobic organism bacterium that infects the rhizospheres of Chloris ciliata and Pappophorum caespitosum, both grasses native to the Chaco region (Cordoba) of Argentina.

References

External links
Type strain of Pseudomonas argentinensis at BacDive -  the Bacterial Diversity Metadatabase

Pseudomonadales
Grasses of Argentina
Natural history of Argentina
Bacteria described in 2005